Altered Space: A 3-D Alien Adventure is a 1991 video game produced for the Nintendo Game Boy.

Gameplay
The player is an astronaut named Humphrey trapped on a spaceship of an alien race known as the Zaks. In addition to avoiding the Zaks, the player must also avoid wardenlike spherical creatures known as Garffs. Humphrey cannot breathe the Zaks' air, so he needs to constantly replenish his own oxygen supply. The Zaks will take half of Humphrey's air should they capture him and send him to a detaining point to be reset like a checkpoint. The object of the game is for Humphrey to reach his own impounded spacecraft and flee back to Earth.

This was the first isometric view game on the Game Boy.

Reception

See also
 Solstice
 Equinox

References

External links
 IGN page
 MobyGames page

1991 video games
Epic/Sony Records games
Game Boy games
Game Boy-only games
Puzzle video games
Science fiction video games
Software Creations games
Video games with isometric graphics
Video games developed in the United Kingdom